The xhubleta is an undulating, bell-shaped folk skirt, worn by Albanian women. It usually is hung on the shoulders using two straps. Part of the Albanian traditional clothing, it has 13 to 17 strips and 5 pieces of felt. The bosom and the part of the xhubleta covered by the apron are made out of crocheted black wool. The bell shape is accentuated in the back part.

The xhubleta is a unique type of dress for its particular shape, structure, and decorating system. It is worn by Albanians in Northern Albania, Kosovo, North Macedonia and Montenegro. There are two types of xhubleta: one is narrow and the other is large. In regard to colors, only two colors are nowadays used: the white one for the unmarried women and the black one for the married ones, however in the past many colors were used, as witnessed by a 17th-century author, who claimed that the peacock did not have as many colors as the xhubleta worn by the women of Kelmend. It is thought that the diminishing in colors in the last two centuries is due to the limitation of its use only in remote mountainous areas.

The xhubleta was included in the List of Intangible Cultural Heritage in Need of Urgent Safeguarding by UNESCO in 2022.

History
The xhubleta is speculated to have an ancient origin. It represents similarities to wearing of some Neolithic figures found in Bosnia, but also in other areas of the Mediterranean region, belonging to the second millennium BC, and linking accordingly with old Mediterranean civilisation.

References

Albanian clothing
Women's clothing
Masterpieces of the Oral and Intangible Heritage of Humanity